Ana Beatriz Soares Nogueira (born 22 October 1967) is a Brazilian actress. In 1987 she won the Silver Bear for Best Actress at the 37th Berlin International Film Festival for her role in the film Vera, directed by Sérgio Toledo.

Filmography
 1984 – Santa Marta Fabril S.A.
 1986 – Mania de Querer
 1987 – Vera
 1988 – O Pagador de Promessas
 1989 – Kananga do Japão
 1990 – Stelinha
 1991 – Matou a Família e Foi ao Cinema
 1991 – O Sorriso do Lagarto
 1991 – Felicidade
 1992 – As Noivas de Copacabana
 1995 – Jenipapo
 1995 – Você Decide
 1996 – O Rei do Gado
 1997 – Anjo Mau
 1999 – Andando nas Nuvens
 2000 – Villa-Lobos - Uma Vida de Paixão
 2001 – Estrela-Guia
 2001 – Copacabana
 2002 – Querido Estranho
 2002 – Lara
 2002 – Poeta de Sete Faces
 2003 – A Casa das Sete Mulheres
 2003 – Celebridade
 2004 – O Diabo a Quatro
 2004 – O Vestido
 2004 – Sob Nova Direção
 2005 – Essas Mulheres
 2006 – Mulheres do Brasil
 2006 – Bicho do Mato
 2008 – Ciranda de Pedra
 2009 – Caminho das Índias
 2011 – Insensato Coração
 2011 – A Vida da Gente
 2012 – Salve Jorge
 2013 – Saramandaia
 2014 – Em Família
 2015 - Além do tempo
 2016 - Rock Story
 2018 - Malhação Vidas Brasileiras
 2018 - O Sétimo Guardião

References

External links

1967 births
Living people
20th-century Brazilian actresses
21st-century Brazilian actresses
Brazilian film actresses
Actresses from Rio de Janeiro (city)
Silver Bear for Best Actress winners